Events from the year 1896 in Sweden

Incumbents
 Monarch – Oscar II
 Prime Minister – Erik Gustaf Boström.

Events
 AIK Fotboll is founded. 
 Eskilstuna Guif is created. 
 Lundsbergs boarding school is established. 
 Svenska Mästerskapet
 Broxvik Drama, a cause célèbre, takes place.
 The Swedish National Council of Women is founded by Ellen Fries.  
 Nya smedjegården is closed and demolished.

Births
 25 November – Tore Holm, sailor (died 1977).
 20 December – Arvid Andersson-Holtman, gymnast (died 1992).

Deaths

 19 October - Emmy Rappe, the first trained nurse in Sweden (born 1835) 
 24 September – Louis Gerhard De Geer, baron (born 1818)
 Kloka Anna i Vallåkra, divine visionary and natural healer (born 1820)
 9 March - Hanna Winge, painter (born 1838)
 December 10 Alfred Nobel engineer (born 1833 in Sweden)

References

 
Years of the 19th century in Sweden